In Indo-European studies, the term s-mobile designates the phenomenon where a PIE root appears to begin with an  which is sometimes but not always present. It is therefore represented in the reflex of the root in some attested derivatives but not others. The fact that there is no consistency about which language groups retain the s-mobile in individual cases is good evidence that it is an original Indo-European phenomenon, and not an element added or lost in the later history of particular languages.

General description
This "movable" prefix *s- appears at the beginning of some Indo-European roots, but is absent from other occurrences of the same root. For example, the stem , perhaps 'aurochs', gives Latin  and Old English  (Modern English ), both meaning 'bull'. Both variants existed side by side in PIE, with Germanic preserving the forms as *steuraz and *þeuraz respectively, but Italic, Celtic, Slavic and others all having words for 'bull' which reflect the root without the *s.  Compare also: Gothic , German , Avestan  (cattle); but Old Norse , Greek , Latin , Old Church Slavonic , Lithuanian , Welsh , Old Irish , Oscan , and Albanian .

In other cases, it is Germanic which preserves only the form without the s mobile.  The Proto-Indo-European root , 'to cover', has descendants English  (from Old English ),  German  'to cover', Latin  'I cover', but Greek  and Russian . 

Sometimes subsequent developments can treat the forms with and without the s-mobile quite differently. For example, by Grimm's law PIE  becomes Proto-Germanic *f, but the combination  is unaffected by this.

S-mobile is always followed by another consonant.

Origins
One theory of the origin of the s-mobile is that it was influenced by a suffix to the preceding word; many inflectional suffixes in PIE are reconstructed as having ended in *s, including the nominative singular and accusative plural of many nouns. The s-mobile can therefore be seen as an interference between the words, a kind of sandhi development. The two variants would still be pronounced differently, as the double -ss- is distinct from a single -s- (compare English this ink and this sink), but the alternation can now be understood as a simple process of gemination (doubling) or degemination.

This can be understood in two ways.
A habit of doubling at the join of the words causes a second *-s- which is understood as part of the second word. This is a kind of assimilation. Obviously, this could not happen to related forms which were used in different syntactic positions, and thus the original form without the *s- survives elsewhere. This is the explanation given by Sihler.
When it is adjacent to a noun suffix in *-s, this produces a geminate. In rapid speech this is reduced to a single *-s- which is understood to belong to the noun, leaving the verb without its initial sibilant. This explanation is more popular among linguists, for two reasons: firstly, because a simplification of geminate *ss is also observable elsewhere in the language (e.g. PIE  → : see Indo-European copula); and secondly, because most PIE roots beginning with the clusters *sp-, *st-, etc. have variants without the *s-, whereas there are very many roots beginning with a simple *p-, *t-, etc. which have no s-mobile equivalents. If the variants without the *s- are original, we would be faced with the problem of explaining why the phenomenon was not more widespread.

Further examples

A number of roots beginning in  look as if they had an s-mobile but the evidence is inconclusive, since several languages (Latin, Greek, Albanian) lost initial s- before sonorants (l, m, n) by regular sound change. Examples include:

Notes

References
Mark R.V. Southern, Sub-Grammatical Survival: Indo-European s-mobile and its Regeneration in Germanic, Journal of Indo-European Studies Monograph 34 (1999).

External links
Indo-European Phonetics — Spirants

S-mobile